In immunology, an adjuvant is a substance that increases or modulates the immune response to a vaccine. The word "adjuvant" comes from the Latin word adiuvare, meaning to help or aid. "An immunologic adjuvant is defined as any substance that acts to accelerate, prolong, or enhance antigen-specific immune responses when used in combination with specific vaccine antigens."

In the early days of vaccine manufacture, significant variations in the efficacy of different batches of the same vaccine were correctly assumed to be caused by contamination of the reaction vessels. However, it was soon found that more scrupulous cleaning actually seemed to reduce the effectiveness of the vaccines, and some contaminants actually enhanced the immune response.

There are many known adjuvants in widespread use, including aluminium salts, oils and virosomes.

Overview
Adjuvants in immunology are often used to modify or augment the effects of a vaccine by stimulating the immune system to respond to the vaccine more vigorously, and thus providing increased immunity to a particular disease. Adjuvants accomplish this task by mimicking specific sets of evolutionarily conserved molecules, so called pathogen-associated molecular patterns, which include liposomes, lipopolysaccharide, molecular cages for antigens, components of bacterial cell walls, and endocytosed nucleic acids such as RNA, double-stranded RNA, single-stranded DNA, and unmethylated CpG dinucleotide-containing DNA. Because immune systems have evolved to recognize these specific antigenic moieties, the presence of an adjuvant in conjunction with the vaccine can greatly increase the innate immune response to the antigen by augmenting the activities of dendritic cells, lymphocytes, and macrophages by mimicking a natural infection.

Types
Inorganic compounds: potassium alum, aluminium hydroxide, aluminium phosphate, calcium phosphate hydroxide
Oils: paraffin oil, propolis (only in preclinical studies), Adjuvant 65 (based on peanut oil. Adjuvant 65 was tested in influenza vaccines in the 1970s, but was never released commercially.)
Bacterial products: killed bacteria of the species Bordetella pertussis, Mycobacterium bovis, toxoids
Plant saponins from Quillaja (see Quil A), soybean, Polygala senega
Cytokines: IL-1, IL-2, IL-12
Combinations: Freund's complete adjuvant, Freund's incomplete adjuvant
Other organic substances: squalene

Inorganic adjuvants

Aluminium salts
There are many adjuvants, some of which are inorganic, that carry the potential to augment immunogenicity. Alum was the first aluminium salt used for this purpose, but has been almost completely replaced by aluminium hydroxide and aluminium phosphate for commercial vaccines. Aluminium salts are the most commonly-used adjuvants in human vaccines. Their adjuvant activity was described in 1926.

The precise mechanism of aluminium salts remains unclear but some insights have been gained. It was formerly thought that they function as delivery systems by generating depots that trap antigens at the injection site, providing a slow release that continues to stimulate the immune system. However, studies have shown that surgical removal of these depots had no impact on the magnitude of IgG1 response.

Alum can trigger dendritic cells and other immune cells to secrete Interleukin 1 beta (IL1β), an immune signal that promotes antibody production. Alum adheres to the cell's plasma membrane and rearranges certain lipids there. Spurred into action, the dendritic cells pick up the antigen and speed to lymph nodes, where they stick tightly to a helper T cell and presumably induce an immune response. A second mechanism depends on alum killing immune cells at the injection site although researchers aren't sure exactly how alum kills these cells. It has been speculated that the dying cells release DNA which serves as an immune alarm. Some studies found that DNA from dying cells causes them to adhere more tightly to helper T cells which ultimately leads to an increased release of antibodies by B cells. No matter what the mechanism is, alum is not a perfect adjuvant because it does not work with all antigens (e.g. malaria and tuberculosis). However, recent research indicates that alum formulated in a nanoparticle form rather than microparticles can broaden the utility of alum adjuvants and promote stronger adjuvant effects.

Organic adjuvants
Freund's complete adjuvant is a solution of inactivated Mycobacterium tuberculosis in mineral oil developed in 1930. It is not safe enough for human use. A version without the bacteria, that is only oil in water, is known as Freund's incomplete adjuvant. It helps vaccines release antigens for a longer time. Despite the side effects, its potential benefit has led to a few clinical trials.

Squalene is a naturally-occurring organic compound used in human and animal vaccines. Squalene is an oil, made up of carbon and hydrogen atoms, produced by plants and is present in many foods. Squalene is also produced by the human liver as a precursor to cholesterol and is present in human sebum. MF59 is an oil-in-water emulsion of squalene adjuvant used in some human vaccines. As of 2021, over 22 million doses of one vaccine with squalene, FLUAD, have been administered with no severe adverse effects reported. AS03 is another squalene-containing adjuvant.

The plant extract QS-21 is a liposome made up of plant saponins from Quillaja saponaria, the soap bark tree. It is a part of the Shingrix vaccine approved in 2017.

Monophosphoryl lipid A (MPL), a detoxified version of Salmonella minnesota lipopolysaccharide, interacts with the receptor TLR4 to enhance immune response. It is also a part of the Shingrix vaccine.

Adaptive immune response
In order to understand the links between the innate immune response and the adaptive immune response to help substantiate an adjuvant function in enhancing adaptive immune responses to the specific antigen of a vaccine, the following points should be considered:

Innate immune response cells such as dendritic cells engulf pathogens through a process called phagocytosis.
Dendritic cells then migrate to the lymph nodes where T cells (adaptive immune cells) wait for signals to trigger their activation.
In the lymph nodes, dendritic cells mince the engulfed pathogen and then express the pathogen clippings as antigen on their cell surface by coupling them to a special receptor known as a major histocompatibility complex.
T cells can then recognize these clippings and undergo a cellular transformation resulting in their own activation.
γδ T cells possess characteristics of both the innate and adaptive immune responses.
Macrophages can also activate T cells in a similar approach (but do not do so naturally).

This process carried out by both dendritic cells and macrophages is termed antigen presentation and represents a physical link between the innate and adaptive immune responses.

Upon activation, mast cells release heparin and histamine to effectively increase trafficking to and seal off the site of infection to allow immune cells of both systems to clear the area of pathogens. In addition, mast cells also release chemokines which result in the positive chemotaxis of other immune cells of both the innate and adaptive immune responses to the infected area.

Due to the variety of mechanisms and links between the innate and adaptive immune response, an adjuvant-enhanced innate immune response results in an enhanced adaptive immune response. Specifically, adjuvants may exert their immune-enhancing effects according to five immune-functional activities.
First, adjuvants may help in the translocation of antigens to the lymph nodes where they can be recognized by T cells. This will ultimately lead to greater T cell activity resulting in a heightened clearance of pathogen throughout the organism.
Second, adjuvants may provide physical protection to antigens which grants the antigen a prolonged delivery. This means the organism will be exposed to the antigen for a longer duration, making the immune system more robust as it makes use of the additional time by upregulating the production of B and T cells needed for greater immunological memory in the adaptive immune response.
Third, adjuvants may help to increase the capacity to cause local reactions at the injection site (during vaccination), inducing greater release of danger signals by chemokine releasing cells such as helper T cells and mast cells.
Fourth, they may induce the release of inflammatory cytokines which helps to not only recruit B and T cells at sites of infection but also to increase transcriptional events leading to a net increase of immune cells as a whole.
Finally, adjuvants are believed to increase the innate immune response to antigen by interacting with pattern recognition receptors (PRRs) on or within accessory cells.

Toll-like receptors
The ability of the immune system to recognize molecules that are broadly shared by pathogens is, in part, due to the presence of immune receptors called toll-like receptors (TLRs) that are expressed on the membranes of leukocytes including dendritic cells, macrophages, natural killer cells, cells of the adaptive immunity (T and B lymphocytes) and non-immune cells (epithelial and endothelial cells, and fibroblasts).

The binding of ligandseither in the form of adjuvant used in vaccinations or in the form of invasive moieties during times of natural infectionTLR marks the key molecular events that ultimately lead to innate immune responses and the development of antigen-specific acquired immunity.

As of 2016, several TLR ligands were in clinical development or being tested in animal models as potential adjuvants.

Medical complications

Humans
Aluminium salts used in many human vaccines are regarded as safe by Food and Drug Administration,  Although there are studies suggesting the role of aluminium, especially injected highly bioavailable antigen-aluminium complexes when used as adjuvant, in Alzheimer's disease development, the majority of researchers do not support a causal connection with aluminium. Adjuvants may make vaccines too reactogenic, which often leads to fever. This is often an expected outcome upon vaccination and is usually controlled in infants by over-the-counter medication if necessary.

An increased number of narcolepsy (a chronic sleep disorder) cases in children and adolescents was observed in Scandinavian and other European countries after vaccinations to address the H1N1 “swine flu” pandemic in 2009. Narcolepsy has previously been associated with HLA-subtype DQB1*602, which has led to the prediction that it is an autoimmune process. After a series of epidemiological investigations, researchers found that the higher incidence correlated with the use of AS03-adjuvanted influenza vaccine (Pandemrix). Those vaccinated with Pandemrix have almost a twelve-times higher risk of developing the disease. The adjuvant of the vaccine contained vitamin E that was no more than a day's normal dietary intake. Vitamin E increases hypocretin-specific fragments that bind to DQB1*602 in cell culture experiments, leading to the hypothesis that autoimmunity may arise in genetically susceptible individuals, but there is no clinical data to support this hypothesis. The third AS03 ingredient is polysorbate 80. Polysorbate80 is also found in both the Oxford–AstraZeneca and Janssen COVID-19 vaccines.

Animals
Aluminium adjuvants have caused motor neuron death in mice when injected directly onto the spine at the scruff of the neck, and oil–water suspensions have been reported to increase the risk of autoimmune disease in mice. Squalene has caused rheumatoid arthritis in rats already prone to arthritis.

In cats, vaccine-associated sarcoma (VAS) occurs at a rate of 1–10 per ten thousand injections. In 1993, a causal relationship between VAS and administration of aluminium adjuvated rabies and FeLV vaccines was established through epidemiologic methods, and in 1996 the Vaccine-Associated Feline Sarcoma Task Force was formed to address the problem. However, evidence conflicts on whether types of vaccines, manufacturers or factors have been associated with sarcomas.

Controversy

TLR signalling
, the premise that TLR signaling acts as the key node in antigen-mediated inflammatory responses has been in question as researchers have observed antigen-mediated inflammatory responses in leukocytes in the absence of TLR signaling. One researcher found that in the absence of MyD88 and Trif (essential adapter proteins in TLR signaling), they were still able to induce inflammatory responses, increase T cell activation and generate greater B cell abundancy using conventional adjuvants (alum, Freund's complete adjuvant, Freund's incomplete adjuvant, and monophosphoryl-lipid A/trehalose dicorynomycolate (Ribi's adjuvant)).

These observations suggest that although TLR activation can lead to increases in antibody responses, TLR activation is not required to induce enhanced innate and adaptive responses to antigens.

Investigating the mechanisms which underlie TLR signaling has been significant in understanding why adjuvants used during vaccinations are so important in augmenting adaptive immune responses to specific antigens. However, with the knowledge that TLR activation is not required for the immune-enhancing effects caused by common adjuvants, we can conclude that there are, in all likelihood, other receptors besides TLRs that have not yet been characterized, opening the door to future research.

Safety
Reports after the first Gulf War linked anthrax vaccine adjuvants to Gulf War syndrome in American and British troops. The US Defence Department strongly denied the claims.

Discussing the safety of squalene as an adjuvant in 2006, the World Health Organisation stated "follow-up to detect any vaccine-related adverse events will need to be performed." No such followup has been published by the WHO. 

Subsequently, the American National Center for Biotechnology Information published an article discussing the comparative safety of vaccine adjuvants which stated that "the biggest remaining challenge in the adjuvant field is to decipher the potential relationship between adjuvants and rare vaccine adverse reactions, such as narcolepsy, macrophagic myofasciitis or Alzheimer's disease."

See also
Beta-glucan
Immunomodulator
Immunostimulant
Pharmaceutic adjuvant

References

External links

Adjuvant therapy
Animal research
Vaxjo database 

Adjuvants
Immunology